Brooklyn's Finest is a 2009 American crime film directed by Antoine Fuqua and written by Michael C. Martin. The film stars Richard Gere, Don Cheadle, Ethan Hawke, and Wesley Snipes. Brooklyn's Finest had its world premiere at the 2009 Sundance Film Festival on January 16, 2009 and was released theatrically in the United States on March 5, 2010.

Plot
Carlo Powers and Detective Sal Procida are having a conversation in a car when Sal shoots Carlo, grabs a bag of money and flees. Sal later confesses the murder to a priest, asking for help with his dire situation: his wife is pregnant with twins, and they live in a house that is too small for their four existing children; it also has mold that jeopardizes his family's health.

Desperate to move, Sal has arranged to purchase a larger home through a woman who owes him a favor. The down payment is due the following Tuesday, and Sal is still short. Sal, who is a highly skilled and accomplished narcotics detective, has begun to pickpocket drug money from raids.

Officer Edward "Eddie" Dugan is a week from retirement after 22 years of unremarkable service to the force. Eddie is assigned to oversee rookies in the tough neighborhoods. However, his personal life is in shambles; as he swills whiskey in the morning to get out of bed, and the only person he can speak to honestly is Chantel, a sex worker he hires regularly.

Detective Tango Butler is an undercover cop working the drug beat. After losing himself in his role as a drug dealer, Tango is tired of the kind of attention attracted by a black man in a black BMW. Having been promised a promotion including a desk job for years, Butler is finally offered a way out if he betrays his close friend Caz Phillips, a known criminal recently released from federal prison. Federal Agent Smith instructs Tango to set up the drug deal that will ensure Caz's arrest and return to federal prison.

Eddie's first rookie partner came from the Marine Corps and becomes disgusted with Eddie's apparent cowardice and cynicism. The rookie asks to be reassigned, but he is killed on his next assignment. Eddie's second rookie partner accidentally fires his gun near a teenager during a petty theft investigation. The teenager goes deaf, leaving the NYPD facing a public relations nightmare. During the investigation, Eddie is remorseful for what happened but refuses to play along with his superiors' attempts to imply that the teenager was a drug dealer.

When Tango warns Caz to abort their upcoming drug deal, they are ambushed. Caz is shot under orders from Red, a gangster Tango had previously humiliated. After Smith makes a racist remark and refuses to pursue Red, a furious Tango lunges at her but fellow officers restrain him.

Sal's latest raid on a complex is cancelled but he leaves to rob the money needed for his house. One of his team members, Detective Ronny Rosario, tries but fails to stop Sal from doing the raid. As he approaches the building, Sal passes Tango, who has come there to kill Red. Sal raids the apartment and, after killing three drug dealers, discovers their stockpile of cash. Unfortunately, Sal is shot and killed by a young man who became suspicious when he noticed Sal entering the building.

After Tango gets his revenge on Red, an arriving Rosario mistakes him for a gangster and shoots him in the back. Only after shooting Tango does Rosario realize he has shot another officer. He immediately calls for an ambulance. Rosario, still determined to stop Sal, leaves a wounded Tango to continue his search for Sal. Rosario witnesses the young man who shot Sal running away from the crime scene and is devastated when he finds Sal's dead body in the apartment.

Meanwhile, Eddie retires and visits Chantel, who declines his offer to move to Connecticut. Afterwards while sitting in his car contemplating suicide, Eddie sees a woman who was reported missing being shoved into a van. He follows the van to the Van Dyke housing projects, where he locates a sex slave dungeon in the basement. Eddie apprehends one of the men and is confronted by a second one.

When the second man does not comply with his orders to get on the floor, Eddie shoots him once in the chest, beginning a violent fight that ends with Eddie strangling his opponent with a zip tie. Eddie finds redemption by rescuing the missing girls.

Cast

 Richard Gere as Officer Eddie Dugan
 Don Cheadle as Detective Clarence Butler / Tango
 Ethan Hawke as Detective Sal Procida
 Wesley Snipes as Casanova "Caz" Phillips
 Vincent D'Onofrio as Bobby "Carlo" Powers
 Brían F. O'Byrne as Detective Ronny Rosario
 Will Patton as Lieutenant Bill Hobarts
 Michael Kenneth Williams as "Red"
 Lili Taylor as Angela Procida
 Shannon Kane as Chantel
 Ellen Barkin as FBI Agent Smith
 Thomas Jefferson Byrd as Uncle Jeb
 Wass Stevens as Detective Patrick Leary
 Armando Riesco as Detective George Montress
 Wade Allain-Marcus as "C-Rayz"
 Logan Marshall Green as Officer Melvin Panton
 Jesse Williams as Officer Eddie Quinlan
 Bruce MacVittie as Father Scarpitta
 Hassan Iniko Johnson as 'Beamer'
 Jas Anderson as "K. Rock"
 Raquel Castro as Katherine
 Tobias Truvillion as Gutta
 Lela Rochon as Investigator #1

Production

Filming
The film was filmed in the three New York City boroughs of Manhattan, Queens, and Brooklyn in July 2008. In Brooklyn, locations included Brownsville and there, among others, the Van Dyke Houses. In Queens, locations included Rego Park. Michael C. Martin's script originally took place primarily in the Louis H. Pink Houses in East New York, which were near where the writer and a couple of his friends grew up.

The total budget for the film was in the $17 million range, and many of the actors took large pay cuts to make the movie. The part of Man Man was given to Zaire Paige, a gang member from the neighborhood; three months after filming, he was involved in the murder of Lethania Garcia, for which he was sentenced to 107 years to life in prison.

Writing
Michael C. Martin, the writer of the screenplay, went to South Shore High School, where a film appreciation course sparked his interest, and an anterior cruciate ligament injury derailed a possible basketball career. He studied film at Brooklyn College. After having been injured in a car accident in 2005, Martin wrote the Finest script for a screenwriter's contest. He did not win but his second prize included a subscription to the Independent Feature Project newsletter. The script also continued to gain attention. Martin found an agent interested in having him write a sequel to the successful film New Jack City. He finally found someone interested in producing his script for Finest, for which he received $200,000.

In an interview at the time of the movie's release, Martin described development of the film:
"Jeanne O’Brien-Ebiri and Mary Viola are responsible for getting this movie made. Jeanne was the first person in the industry to read the script and she was responsible for getting me an agent and the staff job (as a staff writer on the Showtime series Sleeper Cell). And once the script was out there, it came across Mary Viola’s desk at Thunder Road Pictures as a writing sample for New Jack City 2. Mary, a native New Yorker, worked like hell to sell it to the head of Thunder Road, Basil Iwanyk. Basil was an executive on Training Day, he had a great relationship with Antoine. And once Antoine attached himself to the script, Richard Gere, Don Cheadle, Wesley Snipes, and Ethan Hawke followed. Within weeks, it received a green light."

As inspiration for the Finest script, Martin named three Italian neorealist films, Nights of Cabiria, Umberto D., and Bicycle Thief, and two directors, Italian Vittorio De Sica, who directed Umberto and Thief among others, and American Jim Jarmusch.

In the interview, Martin identified his South Shore film teacher as Mr. Braun.

Release

Theatrical
Brooklyn's Finest premiered at the Sundance Film Festival in January 2009, and was picked up by Senator Distribution with a price "in the low seven figures". Due to some financial distress, Senator Distribution was not able to fund its release in 2009. The film was sold again to Overture Films at the 66th Venice Film Festival in September, and was released in North America on March 5, 2010.

Home media
Brooklyn's Finest was released on DVD and Blu-ray in July 2010, and topped the United States home video charts for its first week of release ended July 11.

Reception

Box office
In its debut weekend in the United States, Brooklyn's Finest opened at number two behind Alice in Wonderland with $13,350,299 in 1,936 theaters, averaging $6,896 per theater. As of September 3, 2010, the film has grossed $27,163,593 in the United States theatrically, a good result for its United States distributor Overture Films, which paid less than $3 million to acquire this film's United States rights. 
The film also grossed $36,440,201 in theaters worldwide, and achieved 11th place on Box Office Mojo's  "Dirty Cop" genre ranking, 1973–present.

Critical response
 
The film was met with mixed reviews. It holds a 44% approval rating based on 153 reviews collected by Rotten Tomatoes and has an average rating of 5.48/10. The site's consensus reads: "It's appropriately gritty, and soaked in the kind of palpable tension Antoine Fuqua delivers so well, but Brooklyn's Finest suffers from the comparisons its cliched script provokes". The film received a score of 43% at Metacritic based on 33 reviews from mainstream critics. Audiences polled by CinemaScore gave the film an average grade of "C" on an A+ to F scale.

In his review for the Chicago Sun-Times, Roger Ebert gave the film three stars out of four, concluding, "The film has a basic strength in its performances and craft, but falls short of the high mark Fuqua obviously set for himself." Mick LaSalle of the San Francisco Chronicle praised the actors for "bringing dimension to these stock characters", but criticized the film for being "a melodrama about three cliches in search of a bloodbath."

A. O. Scott of The New York Times also gave the film a mixed review, stating, "the sheer charismatic force of much of the acting keeps you in the movie", but "Mr. Fuqua and Mr. Martin dig themselves into a pulpy predicament, and then find themselves unable to do anything but shoot their way out." The Los Angeles Times reviewer commented that "Brooklyn's Finest is an old style potboiler about desperate cops in dire straits that overcooks both its story and its stars."

Accolades
 BET Awards
 Nominee, Don Cheadle - Best Actor
 Black Reel Awards
 Nominee, Best Picture
 Nominee, Best Ensemble
 Nominee, Antoine Fuqua - Best Director
 Nominee, Michael C. Martin - Best Screenplay: Original or Adapted
 Nominee, Don Cheadle - Best Actor
 Winner, Wesley Snipes - Best Supporting Actor

Bollywood remake
In May 2013, Original Entertainment confirmed to have sealed a five-picture deal with Millennium Films to produce Bollywood remakes of Rambo, The Expendables, 16 Blocks, 88 Minutes, and Brooklyn's Finest, with the productions for Rambo and The Expendables expected to start at the end of that year.

See also
List of black films of the 2010s
List of hood films

References

External links
 
 
 
 
 
 On Directing (Brooklyn's Finest) with Antoine Fuqua nthWORD Magazine Interview by Gina Ponce, April 2010

2009 films
2009 crime drama films
2000s buddy cop films
American buddy cop films
American buddy drama films
American crime drama films
American gangster films
American police detective films
2000s English-language films
Films about drugs
Films about the New York City Police Department
Films about police misconduct
Films set in Brooklyn
Films shot in New York City
Films directed by Antoine Fuqua
Films produced by Basil Iwanyk
Films scored by Marcelo Zarvos
Overture Films films
Thunder Road Films films
2000s American films